Ruslan Barsky (or Roslan Barski, ; born 3 January 1992) is an Israeli professional footballer who plays as a midfielder for Israeli Premier League club Hapoel Hadera.

Early life
Barsky was born in Holon, Israel, to parents who immigrated from Ukraine to Israel. As a child, Barsky was a long-distance runner. In 2010, Barsky's father, a former wrestler, died from cancer.

He also holds a Ukrainian passport.

Club career
In 2017–18, aged 25, Barsky consistently played in the Israeli Premier League for the first time in his career because of injuries. That season against Hapoel Be'er Sheva, he set a league record for distance ran at 12. 7 km.

References

1992 births
Living people
Israeli footballers
Footballers from Holon
Maccabi Tel Aviv F.C. players
Bnei Yehuda Tel Aviv F.C. players
Maccabi Jaffa F.C. players
Hapoel Jerusalem F.C. players
Beitar Tel Aviv Bat Yam F.C. players
Hapoel Haifa F.C. players
Maccabi Bnei Reineh F.C. players
Hapoel Hadera F.C. players
Israeli Premier League players
Liga Leumit players
Israel youth international footballers
Israeli people of Soviet descent
Israeli people of Ukrainian descent
Association football midfielders
Ukrainian people of Israeli descent